In the sixth season of the Balkan International Basketball League, ten participants from Bulgaria, the Republic of Macedonia, Montenegro, Israel and Romania and the new represented country Kosovo has competed.

Teams

Format

First round
In the first round the nine teams play with the other teams, home and away games, eighteen rounds, sixteen games per each team. The top two teams advanced to Final Four. The teams that finished between third and sixth place advanced to the second round.

The opening game has been played on 15 October 2013 and the last match day was played on 26 March 2014.

Second round
The four teams, that finished between third and sixth place in the first round, would play two-leg ties, which would determine the other two participants in the final Four.

The first game was played on 1 April 2014 and the last match day was played on 9 April 2014.

Final four
The four remaining teams played a semifinal match and the winners of those advanced to the final. The losers played in a third-place playoff. The dates of the final Four were 2 and 4 May 2014.

First round

Notes

Second round
The second round are two-legged ties determined on aggregate score. The first legs will be played on April 1-2 and return legs will be played on April 8-9.

Final four

Semifinals

Third place

Final

References

External links
 BIBL official webpage
 Balkan League standings and livescores

2013–14
2013–14 in European basketball leagues
2013–14 in Kosovan basketball
2013–14 in Republic of Macedonia basketball
2013–14 in Bulgarian basketball
2013–14 in Montenegrin basketball
2013–14 in Romanian basketball
2013–14 in Israeli basketball